The  (translated as "Alliance of Red Front-Fighters" or "Red Front Fighters' League"), usually called the  (RFB), was a far-left paramilitary organization affiliated with the Communist Party of Germany (KPD) during the Weimar Republic. It was officially a non-partisan and legally registered association. The organisation was banned by the governing Social Democrats in 1929.

The first local branches of the RFB were established in July 1924. The group's inaugural nationwide meeting was held in February 1925 in Berlin, where  was elected to lead the federal committee.  ('The Red Front') was the newspaper of the RFB. The greeting of  while giving a clenched fist salute gave rise to the expression , often used among friends and foes to refer to the organization instead of its full title. The clenched fist "protecting the friend, fighting off the enemy"  was the symbol of the RFB, used on all its insignia, and its registered trademark from 1 March 1926. In May 1926, during a flag parade, activists used it as a sign of rallying to the movement and as an oath to defend the Soviet Union.

History

Formation
The KPD depended on the Proletarian Hundreds to protect their meetings and demonstrations, but this organization was banned in 1923. This left the KPD's political activities exposed to attacks from the police and right-wing paramilitary organizations such as the nationalist  and the Nazi  (SA). The ninth national conference of the KPD in April 1924 decided to form a new defense organization. It was given the name , with the intent of attracting non-Communist workers as well.

The KPD announced the formation of the RFB to all its local branches, and soon  the first local RFB groups were formed. Most of these first RFB units were located in industrial cities, seaports, and other traditional strongholds of the working class.

Development
Over the years the RFB engaged more and more in violent street fights with the police, the SA, and other political rivals. In 1929, the RFB participated in bloody protests after International Workers' Day was banned in Berlin during what became known as Blutmai (Bloody May). More than 30 people were shot and killed by the police. The RFB was banned and all its assets confiscated by the government. At the time of the ban, the RFB had close to 130,000 members. Others retired from the political scene.

Under the Third Reich
After the Nazi takeover in 1933, former RFB members were among the first arrested and incarcerated in concentration camps. The Nazis sought revenge on their former rivals and many of the RFB died in the Nazi prisons.

Of those who survived or avoided arrest, many followed the call of the Second Spanish Republic during the Spanish Civil War (1936–39). They joined the Centuria Thälmann of the International Brigades to fight against the Nationalist rebels. During World War II former Red Front fighters fought in the Soviet Red Army against Nazi Germany.

After the war
The  and the  claimed to carry on the traditions of the RFB, while the Federal Republic of Germany in West Germany enforced the ban of 1929 and prosecuted former Red Front fighters who admitted to their RFB activities.

Membership and organisation

Members
While many RFB groups were led by KPD members, most Red Front fighters were not party members. Some were even members of the Social Democratic Party of Germany (SPD) or other political organizations.

98% of the RFB belonged to the working class and only 1% had received a higher education. A large part of the RFB were veterans of World War I and some had been actively involved in the November Revolution of 1918.

The number of members grew constantly, peaking with close to 130,000 members at the time of the ban in 1929.
 April 1925: 40,450 members in 558 local groups (49% non-party members)
 June 1925: 51,630 members in 826 local groups (53% non-party members)
 February 1926: 68,392 members in 1,120 local groups (55% non-party members)

At the time of the ban in 1929, only 30% of the RFB were actually KPD members. 70% were non-party or members of other parties.

Sections
It was renamed  (RJ) in 1925 to avoid similarities with the Nazi  and to underline their goal of a united front. 40% of local RFB groups had a section of the RJ.

Sailors of the Imperial German Navy had a major role in the November Revolution of 1918. The RM was also considered an elite unit.

At the 1929 ban, the RFMB had about 4,000 members.

Organizational structure

The RFB's structure was a bottom to top organization. The local groups elected the regional leadership and the regional leaders elected the federal committee.

 1. 
 2. 
 3.  (X)
 3.1.  (X)
 3.2.  (3 ,  men)
 3.3.  (4 ,  men + 1)
 3.4.  (8 men + 1)

The  or "Federal Committee" included:

  (1. Federal Leader)
  (2. Federal Leader, Organizational and Technical Manager)
  (Treasurer)
 
 
 
 
  (Chief Editor )

The  or Regional sections of the RFB included:

 
  (Thuringia)
 
 
 
  (Lower Saxony)
  (Northwest)
  (Ruhr district)
  (Lower Rhine)
  (Middle Rhine)
  (Hesse-Waldeck)
  (Hesse-Frankfurt)
  (Saar district)
 
 
  (Pomerania)
  (East Prussia)
  (Upper Silesia)
  (Silesia)
 
 
  (East Saxony)
  (West Saxony)
  (North Bavaria)
  (South Bavaria)

Plans to form local RFB groups in the cities of Nuremberg and Munich in 1925 were banned by the state of Bavaria. Until 1928 there were no official RFB groups in Bavaria. Only after the end of the ban of the local group Dortmund by the Reichsgericht on April 2, 1928, RFB groups could at least formally be founded also in Bavaria. But there was a constant threat of a ban on events, especially since Bavaria had been pressing for a nationwide ban of RFB since the decision of the Reichsgericht. On April 13, 1928, after the formation of the Bund on Reich level, Jakob Boulanger founded an RFB-Gau Nordbayern with subsequent local groups in Nuremberg, Würzburg, Aschaffenburg, Sulzbach, Bamberg, Hof and Bayreuth. In the summer of 1928, 14 local groups with 800 members, 350 of them in Nuremberg were registered.

Activities

"Protection and Security"

In most cases they provided security services for the various events but also participated in active agitation. Hardened by their harsh work and living conditions, the RFB men engaged in acts of violence against the police and the political rivals who tried to disrupt rallies.

Numerous events ended in mass brawls between the police and the RFB, leaving injured on both sides and in some cases dead.

Since the strategy of the SA was to fight and provoke, violent encounters between the RFB and SA soon became a part of everyday life. The SA achieved some strength in working-class districts, although these areas supported either the SPD or the KPD but not the "brown" Nazi Party the SA stood for.

The RFB members also fought to stop landlords from evicting tenants.

"Social Justice and Peace"
Its statutes defined the RFB as anti-militarist, and therefore it opposed German re-armament. For instance, the RFB and other organizations protested against the spending of billions of Reichsmarks on "pocket battleships", and demanded the money go instead to relieve poverty.

Most RFB public actions were directed against the Weimar government and its involvement with powerful German industrialists. The RFB demanded the preservation of peace and denounced plans for a new war. Most of the RFB also supported the KPD's program of Soviet-style Communism. The RFB therefore was soon considered an "enemy of the state", leading to several temporary bans of its announced parades and meetings.

Other RFB events included propaganda marches in rural areas to get poor farmers and agricultural workers to join their cause.

References

Communist Party of Germany
Anti-fascist organisations in Germany
Left-wing militant groups in Germany
Military wings of socialist parties
Paramilitary organisations of the Weimar Republic
German resistance to Nazism
Military units and formations disestablished in 1933
Defunct communist militant groups